ISO 3166-1 alpha-2 codes are two-letter country codes defined in ISO 3166-1, part of the ISO 3166 standard published by the International Organization for Standardization (ISO), to represent countries, dependent territories, and special areas of geographical interest. They are the most widely used of the country codes published by ISO (the others being alpha-3 and numeric), and are used most prominently for the Internet's country code top-level domains (with a few exceptions). They are also used as country identifiers extending the postal code when appropriate within the international postal system for paper mail, and have replaced the previous one consisting one-letter codes. They were first included as part of the ISO 3166 standard in its first edition in 1974.

Uses and applications
The ISO 3166-1 alpha-2 codes are used in different environments and are also part of other standards. In some cases they are not perfectly implemented.

Perfect implementations
The ISO 3166-1 alpha-2 codes are used in the following standards:

Imperfect implementations
Starting in 1985, ISO 3166-1 alpha-2 codes have been used in the Domain Name System as country code top-level domains (ccTLDs). The Internet Assigned Numbers Authority currently assigns the ccTLDs mostly following the alpha-2 codes, but with a few exceptions.

The WIPO coding standard ST.3 is based on ISO 3166-1 alpha-2 codes, but includes a number of additional codes for international intellectual property organizations, which are currently reserved and not used at the present stage in ISO 3166-1.

This notwithstanding, the Official Journal of the European Communities specified that  and  be used to represent Greece and United Kingdom respectively.

The United Nations uses a combination of ISO 3166-1 alpha-2 and alpha-3 codes, along with codes that pre-date the creation of ISO 3166, for international vehicle registration codes, which are codes used to identify the issuing country of a vehicle registration plate; some of these codes are currently indeterminately reserved in ISO 3166-1.

IETF language tags (conforming to the BCP 47 standard track and maintained in an IANA registry) are also partially derived from ISO 3166-1 alpha-2 codes (for the region subtags). The full list of ISO 3166-1 codes assigned to countries and territories are usable as region subtags. Also, the "exceptionally reserved" alpha-2 codes defined in ISO 3166-1 (with the exception of ) are also usable as region subtags for language tags. However, newer stability policies (agreed with ISO) have been implemented to avoid deleting subtags that have been withdrawn in ISO 3166-1; instead they are kept and aliased to the new preferred subtags, or kept as subtags grouping several countries. Some other region grouping subtags are derived from other standards. Under the newer stability policies, old assigned codes that have been withdrawn from ISO 3166-1 should no longer be reassigned to another country or territory (as has occurred in the past for "CS").

Current codes

Decoding table
The following is a colour-coded decoding table of all ISO 3166-1 alpha-2 codes.

Officially assigned code elements

The following is a complete list of the 249 current officially assigned ISO 3166-1 alpha-2 codes, with the following columns:

 Code: ISO 3166-1 alpha-2 code, pointing to its ISO 3166-2 article
 Country name: English short name officially used by the ISO 3166 Maintenance Agency (ISO 3166/MA)
 Year: Year when alpha-2 code was first officially assigned (1974, first edition of ISO 3166)
 ccTLD: Corresponding country code top-level domain (note that some are inactive); exceptions where another ccTLD is assigned for the country are shown in parentheses
 Notes: Any unofficial notes

User-assigned code elements
    

User-assigned code elements are codes at the disposal of users who need to add further names of countries, territories, or other geographical entities to their in-house application of ISO 3166-1, and the ISO 3166/MA will never use these codes in the updating process of the standard. For example:
 The International Standard Recording Code (ISRC) uses  as a second country code for the United States, as it ran out of three-character registrant codes within the  prefix.  It also uses  for some registrants assigned directly.
Before the adoption of the macroregion code  by ISO, CLDR also used  to represent the European Union.
 The code  is being used by the World Intellectual Property Organization (WIPO) as an indicator for the Community Plant Variety Office.
 The code  is being used by Switzerland as a country code for the Canary Islands, although  is already reserved for that purpose.
 The code  is being used by the UK Government, as an EORI number country code prefix for Northern Ireland, and the members of European union for European Union value added tax reports with trade with Northern Ireland.
 The code  is being used by the European Commission the IMF, and SWIFT, the CLDR, and other organizations as a temporary country code for Kosovo.
 The code  is being used by WIPO as an indicator for the Nordic Patent Institute, an international organization common to Denmark, Iceland, Norway and Sweden.
 The code  is being used by WIPO as an indicator for the International Union for the Protection of New Varieties of Plants.
 The code  is being used by WIPO as an indicator for the Visegrad Patent Institute.
 The code  is being used by WIPO as an indicator for unknown states, other entities or organizations.
 UN/LOCODE assigns  to represent installations in international waters.

Furthermore, the code element  is designated as an escape code if the number of regular user-assigned code elements is not sufficient.

Reserved code elements
Reserved code elements are codes which have become obsolete, or are required in order to enable a particular user application of the standard but do not qualify for inclusion in ISO 3166-1. To avoid transitional application problems and to aid users who require specific additional code elements for the functioning of their coding systems, the ISO 3166/MA, when justified, reserves these codes which it undertakes not to use for other than specified purposes during a limited or indeterminate period of time. The reserved alpha-2 codes can be divided into the following four categories: exceptional reservations, transitional reservations, indeterminate reservations, and codes currently agreed not to use.

Exceptional reservations
Exceptionally reserved code elements are codes reserved at the request of national ISO member bodies, governments and international organizations, which are required in order to support a particular application, as specified by the requesting body and limited to such use; any further use of such code elements is subject to approval by the ISO 3166/MA. The following alpha-2 codes are currently exceptionally reserved:

The following alpha-2 codes were previously exceptionally reserved, but are now officially assigned:

Transitional reservations
Transitional reserved code elements are codes reserved after their deletion from ISO 3166-1. These codes may be used only during a transitional period of at least five years while new code elements that may have replaced them are taken into use. These codes may be reassigned by the ISO 3166/MA after the expiration of the transitional period. The following alpha-2 codes are currently transitionally reserved:

The following alpha-2 code was previously transitionally reserved, but was later reassigned to another country as its official code:

For each deleted alpha-2 code, an entry for the corresponding former country name is included in ISO 3166-3. Each entry is assigned a four-letter alphabetic code, where the first two letters are the deleted alpha-2 code.

Indeterminate reservations
Indeterminately reserved code elements are codes used to designate road vehicles under the 1949 and 1968 United Nations Conventions on Road Traffic but differing from those contained in ISO 3166-1. These code elements are expected eventually to be either eliminated or replaced by code elements within ISO 3166-1. In the meantime, the ISO 3166/MA has reserved such code elements for an indeterminate period. Any use beyond the application of the two Conventions is discouraged and will not be approved by the ISO 3166/MA. Moreover, these codes may be reassigned by the ISO 3166/MA at any time. The following alpha-2 codes are currently indeterminately reserved:

The following alpha-2 codes were previously indeterminately reserved, but have been reassigned to another country as its official code:

 Notes

Codes currently agreed not to use
In addition, the ISO 3166/MA will not use the following alpha-2 codes at the present stage, as they are used for international intellectual property organizations in WIPO Standard ST.3:

However,  was already exceptionally reserved by the ISO 3166/MA to represent Ceuta and Melilla for customs purposes. The ISO 3166/MA proposed in 1995 that  be used by WIPO to represent the Eurasian Patent Organization; however, this request was not honoured by WIPO.

Deleted codes

For each deleted alpha-2 code, an entry for the corresponding former country name is included in ISO 3166-3. Each entry is assigned a four-letter alphabetic code, where the first two letters are the deleted alpha-2 code.

See also
 List of FIPS country codes in FIPS 10-4, part of the Federal Information Processing Standards (FIPS)
 The Regional Indicator Symbol in Unicode, introduced to use these codes
 ISO 639-1, a different set of two-letter codes used for languages

References

Sources and external links
 ISO 3166 Maintenance Agency, International Organization for Standardization (ISO)
 Online Browsing Platform (OBP) — searchable list of country codes
 Text file (English, 2016)
 XML file (English, 2016)
 Reserved code elements under ISO 3166-1 "Codes for the representation of names of countries and their subdivisions – Part 1: Country codes", available on request from ISO 3166/MA
 The World Factbook (public domain), Central Intelligence Agency
 Appendix D – Country Data Codes — comparison of FIPS 10, ISO 3166, and STANAG 1059 country codes
 List of all countries with their 2 digit codes (ISO 3166-1) (CSV, JSON) 
 Comprehensive country codes: ISO 3166, ITU, ISO 4217 currency codes and many more (CSV, JSON) 
 Administrative Divisions of Countries ("Statoids"), Statoids.com
 Country codes — comparison of ISO 3166-1 country codes with other country codes
 ISO 3166-1 Change History

1 alpha-2
Country codes
Location codes
Unique identifiers